The Invasion of the then province of Mato Grosso by the forces of the Paraguayan Army in December 1864, the war declared, one of the first Brazilian reactions was to send a military land contingent to fight the invaders in Mato Grosso.

In April 1865, a column left Rio de Janeiro, under the command of Colonel Manuel Pedro Drago, receiving reinforcements in Uberaba, in the then Province of Minas Gerais, covering more than two thousand kilometers by land until reaching Coxim, in the Province of Mato Grosso, in December of that same year, which she found abandoned.

The same was repeated when they reached Miranda in September 1866. In January 1867, Colonel Carlos de Morais Camisão assumed command of the column, then reduced to 1,680 men, and decided to invade Paraguayan territory, where he penetrated to Laguna, in April . Too distant from Brazilian lines, and without food for the troops, affected by cholera, typhus, and beriberi, the column of the Brazilian Army was forced to withdraw under the constant attacks of Paraguayan cavalry, portrayed in a reliable manner in the literature viscount of Taunay, inflicting severe losses on Brazilians.

Participation of the Terena people

An often overlooked fact is that the Amerindians were instrumental in Brazil in this episode. When Brazilian troops withdrew, the Terena and Guaicurus-Kadiweus Indians were the only ones to defend Brazilian territory, and, using guerrilla tactics, they managed to stop the Paraguayan advance until the Brazilian army could compose itself.

In gratitude for the defense of the homeland, the Kadiwéu Indians won an indigenous reserve of Dom Pedro II, located in the municipality of Bodoquena (Mato Grosso do Sul) with an area of approximately 350 thousand hectares.

References

Laguna
Laguna
Laguna
Laguna
May 1867 events
June 1867 events
History of Mato Grosso do Sul